Masanori Mark Christianson (born Masanori Hakuta Shirota, January 18, 1976 in Tokyo, Japan) is a Japanese-Korean-American musician, creative director, and visual artist. He may be best known as a  bass guitarist and multi-instrumentalist for the Oakland, California indie rock bands Rogue Wave, The Heavenly States, and Release The Sunbird.

Masanori, also an award winning advertising art director, designer, and copywriter, has worked for clients ranging from the Target Corporation to the Tiger Woods Foundation.

Although not a serious venture, Masanori occasionally dabbles in modeling, voice-over and extra work for corporations such as UnitedHealth Group and the Investigation Discovery Channel.

Masanori is the older sibling of Los Angeles based musician and composer Ken Christianson. He is an alumnus of Carleton College.

Trivia

-Spanning the years from grade school through high school, Masanori was a 5 time State of Minnesota Music Teacher's Association classical piano contest performance winner.

-The album "You Can Feel Me" by Los Angeles, California singer Har Mar Superstar was recorded at Masanori's former Uptown, Minneapolis apartment in Minnesota.

-Masanori, Lori Barbero from the Minneapolis, Minnesota band Babes in Toyland and Marcel Galang from the Minneapolis band The Hang Ups have an imaginary band named Rice Grinder in homage to Masanori's Japanese-Korean, Lori's Filipino and Marcel's Chinese-Filipino heritages.

-Masanori's first rock and roll concert that he attended was performed by the Minneapolis, Minnesota alternative rock band The Replacements.

-Masanori designed the logo for the Target World Challenge, an offseason PGA Tour event hosted annually by Tiger Woods at the Jack Nicklaus designed Sherwood Country Club golf course in Thousand Oaks, California.

-Masanori once won a $600 bet from Robert Pollard by reaching level 32 in Dig Dug (Pollard reached level 29).

References 

Living people
1976 births
People from Tokyo
Japanese emigrants to the United States
American musicians of Japanese descent
Carleton College alumni